Summer O'Brien (born 2 October 1991) is an Australian football player who currently plays for Brisbane Roar in the Australian W-League. She previously played for the Gap Gators in the National Premier Leagues Queensland.

Playing career

Club

Brisbane Roar, 2015–present
O'Brien made her debut for Brisbane Roar on 18 October 2015 in a match against Canberra United. She made twelve appearances for the team during the 2015–16 W-League season. Brisbane finished in fourth place during the regular season securing a berth to the playoffs. During the semifinal match against regular season champions Melbourne City, the Roar was defeated 5–4 in a penalty kick shootout after 120 minutes of regular and overtime produced no goals for either side.

Honours
with Gap Gators
 Players’ Player Award

See also

References

Further reading
 Grainey, Timothy (2012), Beyond Bend It Like Beckham: The Global Phenomenon of Women's Soccer, University of Nebraska Press, 
 Stewart, Barbara (2012), Women's Soccer: The Passionate Game, Greystone Books,

External links

 

Living people
Australian women's soccer players
Brisbane Roar FC (A-League Women) players
A-League Women players
Women's association football defenders
1991 births